Taeniopsetta is a genus of small lefteye flounders native to the Indo-Pacific at depths of .

Species
There are currently two recognized species in this genus:
 Taeniopsetta ocellata (Günther, 1880) (Indo-Pacific ocellated flounder)
 Taeniopsetta radula C. H. Gilbert, 1905

References

Bothidae
Marine fish genera
Taxa named by Charles Henry Gilbert